A list of windmills in the Dutch province of Gelderland.

 
Gelderland